Lemland is a municipality of Åland, an autonomous territory of Finland.

The municipality is unilingually Swedish.

The Lemström channel divides Lemland from its neighboring municipality, Jomala. It was widened by Russian POWs in 1882.

History

The church in Lemland was built in the 13th century and has wall paintings from the 14th century. The church is dedicated to Bridget of Sweden.

During the Finnish War in 1808 the Swedish king Gustav IV Adolf had his headquarters in the Lemland parsonage.

Gallery

References

External links

Municipality of Lemland – Official website

Municipalities of Åland